Gugi-dong is a dong, neighbourhood of Jongno-gu in Seoul, South Korea. It is a legal dong (법정동 ) administered under its administrative dong (행정동 ), Pyeongchang-dong.

Attractions
Bukhansan National Park includes several hiking trails.
Seungasa Temple, including the Gugi-dong Seated Buddha Carving (북한산 구기동 마애여래좌상), 5 meters tall, carved on granite rock.

Education

Lycée International Xavier is located in this dong. It moved there from Hyehwa-dong in May 2005.

See also 
Administrative divisions of South Korea

References

External links
 Jongno-gu Official site in English
 Jongno-gu Official site
 Status quo of Jongno-gu by administrative dong 
 Pyeongchang-dong Resident office 
 Origin of Gugi-dong name

Neighbourhoods of Jongno-gu